Peto is a town and the municipal seat of the Peto Municipality, Yucatán in Mexico. As of 2010, the town has a population of 19,821.

Etymology
From the Maya pet crown and uj moon thus meaning crowned moon, in reference to a lunar halo.

Demographics

Climate

List of mayors
  Gerónimo Sánchez (1941-1942)
  Wilfrido Alonso (1943-1944)
  Pedro Muñoz Sánchez (1945-1946)
  Francisco Trejo (1947-1949)
  Rosendo Arrollo (1950-1952)
  Guillermo Baduy Ayala (1953-1955)
  José I. Hernández (1956-1958)
  Nicolás Sogbi Canto (1959-1961)
  Casildo Arroyo (1962-1963)
  Juan Escamilla Sosa (1963)
  Sergio Salazar López (1963-1967)
  Zenón Muñoz Martínez (1968-1970)
  César A. Ruiz V. (1971-1973)
  Mario Arturo Pérez  (1974-1975)
  Sergio Salazar López (1976-1978)
  Roger Calero Muñoz (1979-1981)
  Felipe Sosa Buenfil (1982-1984)
  Gilberto Góngora Sánchez (1985-1987)
  Héctor Sosa Duarte (1988-1990)
  José Vicente Domínguez Canto (1991-1993)
  Castulo Ake Can (1994-1995)
  Samuel Castillo Yah (1996-1998)
  Ruperto Sánchez Uluhac -(1999-2001)
  Jorge Román Avilez y Manzanilla (2001-2004)
  Gilberto Alonso Navarrete Vázquez (2004-2007)
  José Vicente Domínguez Canto (2007-2010)
  Martha Raquel González Cámara (2010-2012)
  Higinio Chan Acosta (2012-2015)
  Jaime Ariel Hernández Santos (2015-2018)
  Edgar Román Calderón Sosa (2018-2021)

References

Populated places in Yucatán
Municipality seats in Yucatán